Philip Lieberman (October 25, 1934 – July 12, 2022) was a cognitive scientist at Brown University, Providence, Rhode Island, United States.  Originally trained in phonetics, he wrote a dissertation on intonation.  His career focused on topics in the evolution of language, and particularly the relationship between the evolution of the vocal tract, the human brain, and the evolution of speech, cognition and language.

Biography
Lieberman initially studied electrical engineering at Massachusetts Institute of Technology (MIT). He received his doctorate in linguistics from MIT, completing his dissertation in 1966. In the late 1950s and 1960s he worked as a research assistant before serving in the United States Air Force, carrying out research at the Air Force Cambridge Research Laboratories (AFCRL) and Hanscom Air Force Base as well as working at Haskins Laboratories.

From 1967 to 1974 he worked at the University of Connecticut.

In 1974 he was appointed to the faculty at Brown University, where he was George Hazard Crooker Professor from 1992 to 1997. In 1997 he became the Fred M. Seed Professor of Cognitive and Linguistic Sciences, and in 1999 he became Professor of Anthropology, both at Brown University. Since 2012, when he retired from teaching, he became The George Hazard Crooker University Professor, emeritus

Lieberman was awarded a Guggenheim Fellowship in psychology in 1987. In 1990, Lieberman gave the Nijmegen Lectures of the Max Planck Institute for Psycholinguistics under the title 'The evolution of language and cognition'. He was also a fellow of the American Association for the Advancement of Science, the American Psychological Association, and the American Anthropological Association.

Lieberman's interests included photography and mountaineering. A collection of over 400 photographs of Nepal by Lieberman is held at the Haffenreffer Museum of Anthropology. Lieberman's photographs have also been exhibited at and are in the collections at the Rhode Island School of Design Museum. His photographs of life in remote Himalayan regions can be viewed on the website of the Tibetan and Himalayan Digital Library.

Partial list of works

References

External links
Biographical
Philip Lieberman (Department of Cognitive and Linguistic Sciences at Brown University)
Philip Lieberman (Anthropology Department at Brown University)
Philip Lieberman (Research Profile at Brown University)
Philip Lieberman (CARTA profile – Center for Academic Research and Training in Anthropogeny)
Other
Tibetan Buddhist Wall Paintings of Mustang, Nepal by Philip and Marcia R. Lieberman (Brown University Library Center for Digital Initiatives)
Review by James R. Hurford of Human Language and our Reptilian Brain, Quarterly Review of Biology, September 2001 (Edinburgh University)
First chapter of Eve Spoke (part of a set of 'first chapters' hosted by The New York Times books section, account required)
Neanderthals speak for first time in 50,000 years, April 2008 news story (The Daily Telegraph)
Mind the Altitude, February 2012 lecture with Kurt Diemberger (Rubin Museum of Art)

1934 births
2022 deaths
Linguists from the United States
Anthropological linguists
Fellows of the American Association for the Advancement of Science
Haskins Laboratories scientists
Brown University faculty
Massachusetts Institute of Technology alumni
People from Brooklyn